The B1 North Athens electoral constituency is a parliamentary constituency of Greece, created after the breakup of Athens B in 2018.

Boundaries

The constituency includes most of the northern suburbs of the Athens urban area:

Election results

2019 Greek legislative election

References

Parliamentary constituencies of Greece
2018 establishments in Greece
Constituencies established in 2018
Politics of Athens